This is a list of electoral results for the Electoral district of Ashford in South Australian state elections from the district's first election in 1997 until the 2018 state election, when the seat was abolished allowing the 2016 electoral redistribution.

Members for Ashford

Election results

Elections in the 2010s

Elections in the 2000s

References

External links

2002 SA election: Antony Green ABC

South Australian state electoral results by district